Little Dry Creek is a short tributary of the South Platte River, approximately  long, in Arapahoe County, Colorado in the United States. The creek drains a suburban area south of Denver. It rises in Centennial, Arapahoe County, west of  I-25, and flows generally northwest into Englewood. It has historically been used for irrigation and feeds an aqueduct that runs parallel to it. The creek flows into South Platte just south of West Dartmouth Avenue approximately two tenths of a mile west of its intersection with Santa Fe Drive which is  US 85.

The Little Dry Creek Trail intersects the Highline Canal Trail in Cherry Hills Village.

The mouth of the creek is noted as the location of the first significant gold discovery in present-day Colorado. In the first week of July 1858, Green Russell and his brothers discovered a gold pocket that yielded several hundred dollars' worth of gold. The discovery set off the Colorado Gold Rush in the following year.

See also
List of rivers of Colorado

References

Colorado Mining Boom
Rivers of Colorado
Rivers of Arapahoe County, Colorado
Englewood, Colorado
Tributaries of the Platte River